Mont Foster is a mountain of the Appalachian Mountains range, located in the municipality of Saint-Étienne-de-Bolton, Quebec.

See also 

List of mountains of Quebec

References 

Appalachian summits
Summits of Estrie
Mountains of Quebec under 1000 metres